Makaukpat is a village in Homalin Township, Hkamti District, in the Sagaing Region of northwestern Burma. It lies to the north of Gwedaukkon.

References

External links
Maplandia World Gazetteer

Populated places in Hkamti District
Homalin Township